The soprano cornet is a transposing brass instrument similar to the standard B cornet but pitched a fourth higher in E.

A single soprano cornet is usually seen in brass bands and silver bands and can be found playing lead or descant parts in other musical ensembles.

Further reading
 Introduction to the E soprano cornet by Bram Gay original from Sounding Brass, Issue 6, 1977.

References

Brass instruments
E-flat instruments